This article is about the demographic features of the population of Uganda, including population density, ethnicity, education level, health of the populace, economic status, religious affiliations and other aspects of the population.

Population

The proportion of children below the age of 15 in 2015 was 48.1 percent, 49.4 percent was between 15 and 65 years of age, while 2.5 percent was 65 years or older.

Population by Sex and Age Group (Census 27.VIII.2014): 

Population Estimates by Sex and Age Group (01.VII.2020):

United Nations population projections
Numbers are in thousands.

Refugee population

According to the UNHCR, Uganda hosts over 1.1 million refugees on its soil as of November 2018. Most come from neighbouring countries in the African Great Lakes region, particularly South Sudan (68.0 percent) and Democratic Republic of the Congo (24.6%).

Vital statistics
Registration of births and deaths in Uganda is not yet complete. The Population Division of the United Nations Department of Economic and Social Affairs prepared the following estimates.

Fertility and births
Total Fertility Rate (TFR)(Wanted Fertility Rate) and Crude Birth Rate (CBR):

Fertility data as of 2011 and 2016 (DHS Program):

Life expectancy at birth

South Asians, Europeans and Arabs

During the Uganda Protectorate period, the British colonialists used South Asian immigrants as intermediaries. Following independence they constituted the largest non-indigenous ethnic group in Uganda, at around 80,000 people, and they dominated trade, industry, and the professions. This caused resentment among the native African majority, which was exploited by post-Independence leaders.

After Idi Amin came to power in 1971, he declared "economic war" on the Indians, culminating in the Expulsion of Asians in Uganda in 1972. Since Amin's overthrow in 1979 some Asians have returned. There are between 15,000 and 25,000 in Uganda today, nearly all in the capital Kampala.

There are also about 10,000 Europeans, mostly of native English origin, and 3,000 Arabs of various national origins in Uganda.

Other demographic statistics 
Demographic statistics of Uganda in 2022:
One birth every 19 seconds	
One death every 2 minutes	
One net migrant every 9 minutes	
Net gain of one person every 23 seconds

The following demographic statistics are from the CIA World Factbook, unless otherwise indicated.

Population
46,205,893 (2022 est.)
44,279,563 (June 2018 estimate)

Religions

Protestant 45.1% (Anglican 32.0%, Pentecostal/Born Again/Evangelical 11.1%, Seventh Day Adventist 1.7%, Baptist .3%), Roman Catholic 39.3%, Muslim 13.7%, other 1.6%, none 0.2% (2014 est.)

Uganda is a religiously diverse nation with Christianity being the most widely professed religion. According to the 2014 census, over 84 percent of the population was Christian while about 14 percent of the population adhered to Islam, making it the largest minority religion. In 2009, the northern and west Nile regions were dominated by Roman Catholics, and Iganga District in the east of Uganda had the highest percentage of Muslims.

Age structure
0-14 years: 48.21% (male 10,548,913/female 10,304,876)
15-24 years: 20.25% (male 4,236,231/female 4,521,698)
25-54 years: 26.24% (male 5,202,570/female 6,147,304)
55-64 years: 2.91% (male 579,110/female 681,052)
65 years and over: 2.38% (male 442,159/female 589,053) (2020 est.)

Birth rate
40.94 births/1,000 population (2022 est.) Country comparison to the world: 5th
42.9 births/1,000 population (2017 est.)

Death rate
5.02 deaths/1,000 population (2022 est.) Country comparison to the world: 195th
10.2 deaths/1,000 population (2017 est.)

Total fertility rate
5.36 children born/woman (2022 est.) Country comparison to the world: 7th

Population growth rate
3.27% (2022 est.) Country comparison to the world: 8
3.2% (2017 est.)

Median age
total: 15.7 years. Country comparison to the world: 226th
male: 14.9 years
female: 16.5 years (2020 est.)

Net migration rate
-3.26 migrant(s)/1,000 population (2022 est.) Country comparison to the world: 186th
-0.7 migrants/1,000 population (2017 est.)

Mother's mean age at first birth
19.4 years (2016 est.)
note: median age at first birth among women 20-49

Contraceptive prevalence rate
41.8% (2018)

Urbanization
urban population: 26.2% of total population (2022)
rate of urbanization: 5.41% annual rate of change (2020-25 est.)

urban population: 23.8% of total population (2018)
rate of urbanization: 5.7% annual rate of change (2015-20 est.)

Sex ratio
at birth:
1.03 male(s)/female
under 15 years:
1.01 male(s)/female
15-64 years:
1.01 male(s)/female
65 years and over:
0.7 male(s)/female
total population:
1.01 male(s)/female (2009 estimate)

Life expectancy at birth
total population: 68.96 years. Country comparison to the world: 180th
male: 66.71 years
female: 71.27 years (2022 est.)

total population: 63.3 years
male: 62.2 years
female: 64.2 years (2014 population census Ubos)

Major infectious diseases
degree of risk: very high (2020)
food or waterborne diseases: bacterial diarrhea, hepatitis A and E, and typhoid fever
vectorborne diseases: malaria, dengue fever, and Trypanosomiasis-Gambiense (African sleeping sickness)
water contact diseases: schistosomiasis
animal contact diseases: rabies

note: on 21 March 2022, the US Centers for Disease Control and Prevention (CDC) issued a Travel Alert for polio in Africa; Uganda is currently considered a high risk to travelers for circulating vaccine-derived polioviruses (cVDPV); vaccine-derived poliovirus (VDPV) is a strain of the weakened poliovirus that was initially included in oral polio vaccine (OPV) and that has changed over time and behaves more like the wild or naturally occurring virus; this means it can be spread more easily to people who are unvaccinated against polio and who come in contact with the stool or respiratory secretions, such as from a sneeze, of an “infected” person who received oral polio vaccine; the CDC recommends that before any international travel, anyone unvaccinated, incompletely vaccinated, or with an unknown polio vaccination status should complete the routine polio vaccine series; before travel to any high-risk destination, CDC recommends that adults who previously completed the full, routine polio vaccine series receive a single, lifetime booster dose of polio vaccine

Education expenditures
3% of GDP (2020) Country comparison to the world: 152nd

Literacy
definition: age 15 and over can read and write
total population: 76.5%
male: 82.7%
female: 70.8% (2018)

School life expectancy (primary to tertiary education)
total: 10 years
male: 10 years
female: 10 years (2011)

Unemployment, youth ages 15-24
total: 15.6%
male: 13.8%
female: 17.6% (2017 est.)

Nationality
noun:
Ugandan
adjective:
Ugandan

Ethnic groups
Baganda 16.5%
 Banyankole 9.8%
 Basoga 8.8%
 Bakiga 7.1%
 Iteso 7%
 Langi 6.3%
 Bagisu 4.9%
 Acholi 4.4%
 Lugbara 3.3%
Other 32.1% 
Multi-racial (unknown percentage, recognized in 2016 in Uganda as a multi-racial ethnic group) Multiracial Ugandans in Uganda

Languages

English (official national language, taught in grade schools, used in courts of law and by most newspapers and some radio broadcasts), Swahili (recently made second official language, important regionally but spoken by very few people in Uganda), Luganda (most widely used of the Niger–Congo languages, preferred for native language publications in the capital and may be taught in school), other Bantu languages, Nilo-Saharan languages and Arabic.

See also
 Youth in Uganda

References